Riley Hill School is a historic Rosenwald School building located in Wendell, North Carolina, a town in eastern Wake County. It was built in 1928, and is a one-story, brick building with an "H"-shaped plan.   The five-bay original section has a one-story porch with simple Doric order columns in the Colonial Revival style. The school closed its doors in 1970, but was purchased in 1991 by the Riley Hill Baptist Church. It caught fire on September 25, 2020. Much of the structure was damaged.

In April 2001, Riley Hill School was listed on the National Register of Historic Places.

See also
 List of Registered Historic Places in North Carolina

References

Rosenwald schools in North Carolina
School buildings on the National Register of Historic Places in North Carolina
School buildings completed in 1928
Colonial Revival architecture in North Carolina
Buildings and structures in Wake County, North Carolina
National Register of Historic Places in Wake County, North Carolina
1928 establishments in North Carolina